Olio is an album by Italian singer Mina, issued in 1999.

The album includes a bilingual version of the Shakespears Sister song "Stay" sung as a duet with Piero Pelù.

Another notable track is "Canto largo" which has been used as the opening theme of the long-running Italian soap opera Vivere.

Track listing 
Grande amore - 4:37
Dint' 'o viento - 4:18
Come gocce - 5:13
Canto largo - 3:12
Non passa - 5:07
Stay With Me (Stay) - 4:13
Io voglio solo te - 4:43
Lacreme e voce - 4:47
Il meccanismo - 3:45
E mi manchi - 5:16

1999 albums
Mina (Italian singer) albums